The Chucuri gecko (Gonatodes chucuri) is a species of lizard in the family Sphaerodactylidae. The species is endemic to Colombia.

References

Gonatodes
Reptiles described in 2020